Olearia gravis is a species of flowering plant in the family Asteraceae and is endemic to south-eastern Australia. It is a shrub with elliptic or egg-shaped leaves and white and yellow, daisy-like inflorescences.

Description
Each head has 20 to 22 white ray florets surrounding 17 to 49 yellow disc florets. Flowering occurs from August to November and the fruit is a glabrous achene, the pappus with 31 to 39 bristles.

Taxonomy
This daisy-bush was first formally described in 1865 by Ferdinand von Mueller who gave it the name Aster gravis in his Fragmenta Phytographiae Australiae from specimens collected near Tenterfield. In 1867, George Bentham changed the name to Olearia glandulosa in Flora Australiensis. The specific epithet (gravis) means "heavy" or "weighty".

Distribution and habitat
Olearia gravis grows in forest in mountain areas from south-east Queensland to the Blue Mountains  in New South Wales.

References

gravis
Asterales of Australia
Flora of New South Wales
Taxa named by Ferdinand von Mueller
Plants described in 1865